Otto Lin was born Chui Chau Lin (林垂宙) in Shantou, Guangdong, China, in 1938. He came to Hong Kong as a refugee and went to Taiwan in 1953 where education at K-12 level was free. He attended National Taiwan University and received a BS in chemical engineering in 1960. After serving in ROTC, he was admitted to University of Illinois at Champaign-Urbana for post-graduate studies. Later he transferred to Columbia University in the City of New York, received the Ph.D. degree in 1967 in chemistry. His doctoral research was on the relationship of macromolecular conformation and hydrodynamic properties of DNA.

1967: working at Du Pont on innovations in polymer rheology
He was recruited by Du Pont de Nemours and Company (Wilmington, DE) to explore the role of rheology in polymer coatings. Working at both Marshall Laboratory (Philadelphia) and the Experimental Station (Wilmington), he focused on developing polymer coating systems in compliance with air pollution control regulations gradually being introduced in the United States. His assignment was multi-faceted involving coordinating technical studies in polymer science, rheological design, application engineering and field services.  Later the assignment was broadened to include electronic circuit products.

The Du Pont experience gave  him some insights on pursuit of innovations in many leading U. S. corporations such as General Motors, General Electrics, IBM, AT&T, and Boeing. All were clients he would call to resolve application issues involving innovative Du Pont trade marked materials. Later in 1987, when he attended the Advanced Management Program (AMP, Class 101) at Harvard University Graduate School of Business, he expounded the value of multi-disciplinary collaboration in problem-solving even for companies of competing interests.

1979-1982: building technology infrastructure in Taiwan
In 1979,  he went to Taiwan on a sabbatical leave and was appointed Professor and Dean of the School of Engineering, National Tsing Hua University in Hsin-Chu. At the request of National Science Council (Chairman: Shien-Shiu Shu), he chaired an expert committee to lay out a blueprint for the development of polymer science and engineering which was a part of the industrial strategy to upgrade the productivity of the petrochemical clusters in Taiwan.

Concurrently, he was charged to manage the Tsing-Hua development of experimental electric vehicles, a pioneering R&D program aimed at lifting Taiwan's fuel efficiency and environmental protection in the petroleum driven economy. Embarking on EV in the early 1980s reflected the vision of the leadership of Chiang Ching-Kuo and his technocrat teams including Yuen-Hsuan Sun, Shien-Shiu Shu, and Kuo-Ting Li.  The EV effort was later aborted due to the deficiency of lead acid battery technology and diverse social priorities. Nevertheless, it has paved Lin's research interest in national innovation system where university, technology institute, business groups and government agencies of a country or region collaborated for overall economic development.

He also played the role of advisor to the Hsin-Chu Science Based Industrial Park which was at its planning stage under NSC. The Park was designed to attract domestic and foreign entrepreneurs to implement their innovations. In the end it has become the cradle of Taiwan's high tech industry. By the year 2000, over 65% of the world production of microelectronic chips were manufactured by companies of the Science Park.

1983: deading a New Research Lab in Materials Science

In 1982, the  new Materials Research Laboratories (MRL) was established under Industrial Technology Research Institute (ITRI) and Lin was appointed as its founding Director. But an illness has kept him from coming on board until 1983 when he resigned from Du Pont and moved his family (wife, Ada and 2 school age children, Ann, Gene, and later, Dean) to Hsin- Chu. He started a thorough planning for MRL to position it as the future center of excellence in materials science and engineering for Taiwan. It consisted of 7 technical divisions: metallurgy, polymer, fine ceramics, opto-electronics, corrosion protection, sensor materials and systems, materials characterization and selection. Additionally, a large technical service group was established for services to the industries. He instituted programs in recruitment, international exchanges and training. In the succeeding years, MRL was to become the birthplace of carbon fiber bicycles, high strength specialty steels, flexible printed circuits, laser diodes, electronic ceramics and played a key role in nuclear power plant safety and maintenance. Since most of the technology fields was new in Taiwan, he established collaborative programs globally including U.S. (MIT, U of California, U of Washington), Japan (NIRIM, Hitachi, Toshiba) and Germany (IZFT). He was elected president of the Chinese Society of Materials Science (Taiwan). He led CSMS to participate in the Materials Research Society (International), where working relationship with counterparts from the Chinese Mainland was established.

1988–1994: leading ITRI

Lin was appointed executive director and President of ITRI in 1988, succeeding Morris Chang who took charge as CEO of the Taiwan Semiconductor Manufacturing Corporation (TSMC), the largest spin-off company of ITRI. Under Chang's stewardship, it was to become the world leader of microelectronics technology. 
       
ITRI has gradually developed to be the leading technology institution in Taiwan dedicated to upgrading traditional industry and nurturing high-tech industry. It nurtured streams of technology transfer for commercialization: laptop computers, electronic components, design and packaging of electronic modules, advanced IC testing, opto-electronic systems, engineering composites, industrial automation, specialty chemicals, energy conservations, pollution abatements, industrial safety, quality and standards. All the ITRI labs were led by expert professionals recruited world-wide. Lin considered the followings as headquarters' responsibility: defining visions, setting objectives and strategy, strengthening infrastructure, providing resources and supports, outlining performance standards and cultivating an institutional culture.  All have contributed to transforming Taiwan into a knowledge-based economy in the 21st Century.

Lin has guided ITRI to participate in global high tech community. It has established alliance or collaboration with the Fraunhofer Gesselschaft (Germany), TNO (The Netherland), SISIR (Singapore), CSIRO (Australia), AT&T Bell Labs (U.S.), and others.

He also initiated scientific and technological exchanges between ITRI and the Chinese Academy of Sciences and institutions in the Chinese Mainland, albeit an uncertain political environment between the two sides of the Taiwan Strait.
 
He was elected a foreign member to the Royal Swedish Academy of Engineering Sciences (IVA), Member of the Hong Kong Academy of Engineering Sciences, President of the Asia Pacific Confederation of Chemical Engineering (APCChE), receiving TWNSO Technology Award of the Third World Academy of Sciences, Drexel University Industrial Leadership Award, CIE-USA Award of Outstanding accomplishments, and other honors.

1995-2000: international engagements in innovation and entrepreneurship

Lin retired from ITRI in 1995 after serving two terms of presidency. He rejoined Tsing-Hua University at Hsinchu as Professor of Industrial Engineering and Engineering Management and was soon offered as Senior Vice President and CTO of the Westlake Group of Companies (Houston) which was in the petrochemical business. After a short stay, he accepted an appointment as Visiting Professor at the National University of Singapore. He helped establish the cooperation in education and research between NUS and MIT which later became collaboration between Singapore and MIT.

He participated actively in global innovation organizations. He was twice invited speaker at the Six Country Conference and repeatedly, the Salzburg Global Seminar in Austria and USA.

1997-2007:  Hong Kong University of Science and Technology

In April 1997, Lin joined the new Hong Kong University of Science and Technology (HKUST) as Vice President-Research and Development.  At the juncture of Hong Kong returning to Chinese sovereignty, Lin, like many of his peers born in the time of Sino-Japanese War, felt it a duty to contribute to this historic transition by working at Hong Kong.  At the university, he placed focus on establishing research infrastructure, research strategy and university-society outreach. He spearheaded the development of the Nan-Sha IT Park, a partnership of HKUST, the Fok Ying-Tung Foundation, and Guang-zhou City Government, at a place near Hu-Men where the historical Opium War was fought, with the hope to transform it to a center of innovation and entrepreneurship for the future Greater Hong Kong-Guangdong Bay Area. He took up the post of President/CEO of China Nansha Technology Enterprises, which provided the backbone supports of the Park. He retired at 2009 but remained affiliated as a faculty member in the departments of IEEM and CBME at HKUST.  In  a decade's time, HKUST grew rapidly and was assessed by Times Higher Education World University Rankings and Quacquarelli Symonds (QS World University Rankings) as in the top 50th of world class universities. The university has announced in Spring 2021 the opening of a full fledge campus in Nansha-GuangZhou, starting the academic year 2022.

An oral history conducted in 2007-2009 by the Bancroft Library, University of California-Berkeley, under a grant from the Kauffman Foundation, has documented Lin's work on promoting innovation, entrepreneurship and his efforts on education.

2009 onward: promoting innovation and traditional Chinese culture
He remained to be active in lecturing, writing, and consultancy. He held honorary/advisory professorship with many universities including: Tsinghua University (Beijing), Beijing Institute of Technology, University of Science and Technology (Hefei), Shanghai JiaoTong University, Xian JiaoTong University and Southwest Jiaotong University (Chengdu) and Hong Kong Polytechnic University. He was repeatedly invited as lecturer of the national R&D Leadership Management Education (M.O.S.T.-China), International Technology Incubation (M.O.S.T-China) and the Pu-dong Executive Leadership Program (CCP-China). Besides promoting national innovation system, he advocated the principles of Laozi as the source of innovation and Confucius on entrepreneurship management, by illustration of examples from modern innovations.

From 2009 to 2020. He helped connect the HKPolyU technology of fiber optics sensing system to the development of Beijing-Shanghai high-speed rail to improve the health monitoring and safety management of major industrial infrastructures.  In the Spring of 2021, he was invited to join Hong Kong Baptist University as  Senior Advisor to the President and Vice Chancellor, and Honorary Professor of Business.  His focus was on advocating significance of soft power leadership and innovations in a post Covid Pandemic society.

Extracurricular service in entrepreneurship
Over 30 years and at different periods, he participated in the management of public corporations and technology start-ups by serving as Advisors or member of Board of Directors. These included: Taiwan Power Corporation, Chinese Petroleum Corp., China Technical Consultant Services, Tsing-Tech Innovations, China Nansha Technology Enterprises, Evergreen Specialty Steels Ltd., SYNergy Science- Technology Corp, APT Photo-electronics Ltd., and others.

He has published over 100 technical papers and presentations, and 16 book chapters. After 2010, he has written five books on management of technology, innovation, entrepreneurship, soft power, globalization, and national innovation system:

Has China Risen? Competition of Soft Power in the Globalization Era (Text in Chinese: 中華崛起未？全球化時代軟實⼒的競賽. 2010, ⾹港⼤學出版社) ISBN 978-988-8028-95- 5
The Technology Innovation Quartet: Secrets of Successful Entrepreneurship (Text in Chinese: 科技創新四重奏-成功創業故事解密, 2013, 商訊⽂化出版社, 台北) ISBN 978- 986-5812-02-7
The Innovation Quartet: From Lab to Market (Text in Chinese: 創新四重奏-從實驗室到市場, 2014. 上海交通⼤學出版社, 簡體中⽂版- based on 2 above with added materials) ISBN 978-7-313-11385-6
Innovation and Entrepreneurship: Choice and Challenge (World Scientific Publishers, Singapore, 2018) ISBN 978-981-3146-60-0

References

External links
EURO-CASE Annual Conference on Innovation Policy, Brussels,  3 December 2014. , Speech by Otto C. C. Lin, “National Innovation Systems in the Greater China Region.” 
HKUST. Department of Industrial Engineering and Logistics Management, Faculty List
HKUST. Department of Chemical and Biomolecular Engineering, Faculty List, 
Lecture, “Laozi on Innovation”, Hong Kong Polytechnic University Dean of Students Talk Series, 26 January 2021, 
Lecture, “Confucius on Entrepreneurship”, Hong Kong Polytechnic University Dean of Students Talk Series, 9 March 2021, 
Invited Speech, “Soft Power: From Laozi- Kong Fuzi to the 21st Century”, Hong Kong University Science and Technology, May 2021, 
Invited Speech, “University‘s Role in Knowledge Creation and Knowledge Transfer,” Hong Kong Baptist University, 4 June 2021, 

1938 births
Living people
Writers from Shantou
Columbia Graduate School of Arts and Sciences alumni
National Taiwan University alumni
Chinese chemical engineers
Educators from Guangdong
Chinese science writers
Engineers from Guangdong
Chemists from Guangdong